Sledgers Glacier is a long tributary glacier in the Bowers Mountains, draining northwest from Husky Pass and along the north flank of Lanterman Range to enter Rennick Glacier between Carnes Crag and Mount Gow. Named by the northern party of New Zealand Geological Survey Antarctic Expedition (NZGSAE), 1963–64, in appreciation of all Antarctic sledging men and the difficult areas they have covered on foot. This glacier was traveled in arduous conditions by the NZGSAE party.

Further reading 
 International Symposium on Antarctic Earth Sciences 5th : 1987, Geological Evolution of Antarctica, Cambridge, England
 M. G. Laird (1981), Lower Palaeozoic rocks of the Ross Sea area and their significance in the Gondwana context, Journal of the Royal Society of New Zealand, 11:4, 425-438, DOI: 10.1080/03036758.1981.10423332

External links 

 Sledgers Glacier on USGS website
 Sledgers Glacier on the Antarctica New Zealand Digital Asset Manager website
 Sledgers Glacier on SCAR website
 Sledgers Glacier - distance calculator
 Sledgers Glacier current weather
 Sledgers Glacier long term updated weather forecast
 Sledgers Glacier - historical weather data

References 

Glaciers of Pennell Coast
1963 in Antarctica
1964 in Antarctica